

Cambodia

Cameroon

Canada

Cape Verde

Central African Republic

Chad

Chile

China, People's Republic of

China, Republic of (Taiwan)

Colombia

Congo, Democratic Republic of the

Congo, Republic of the

Costa Rica

Croatia

Cuba

Curaçao

Cyprus

Czech Republic

Côte d'Ivoire (Ivory Coast)

Denmark

Djibouti

Dominican Republic

East Timor

Ecuador

Egypt

El Salvador

Equatorial Guinea

Eritrea

Estonia

Ethiopia

Finland

France

See also
 World largest cities

References

2014 United Nations Demographic Yearbook (Table 8: Population of capital cities and cities of 100,000 or more inhabitants: latest available year, 1995 - 2014) United Nations Statistics Division, accessed 15 November 2016

Towns and cities with 100,000 or more inhabitants
100,000 or more inhabitants
D